Bretteville may refer to:

Places 
 in the Manche département, France:
 Bretteville, Manche
 Bretteville-sur-Ay
 in the Calvados département, France:
 Bretteville-sur-Dives
 Bretteville-sur-Laize
 Bretteville-sur-Odon
 Bretteville-le-Rabet
 Bretteville-l'Orgueilleuse
 in the Seine-Maritime département, France:
 Bretteville-du-Grand-Caux
 Bretteville-Saint-Laurent
 Varneville-Bretteville

People
 Bretteville family
 Alma de Bretteville Spreckels (1881–1968), an American socialite and philanthropist
 Christian Zetlitz Bretteville (1800–1871), a Norwegian politician
 Sheila Levrant de Bretteville (living), an American graphic designer, artist and educator

Norman-language surnames
Surnames of French origin